Təhlə may refer to:
 Təhlə, Barda, Azerbaijan
 Təhlə, Goranboy, Azerbaijan

See also
Təklə (disambiguation)